Huddersfield Town's 2006–07 campaign saw Town fail to make any progress in Football League One, which subsequently saw Peter Jackson lose his job in March, being replaced by Andy Ritchie the following month. The irony of his appointment being that it was Ritchie's Barnsley side who stopped Jackson's Terriers from reaching the play-off final the previous season.

Squad at the start of the season

Review
Following the narrow play-off defeat in May 2006 to neighbours Barnsley, the 2006–07 season started with high hopes that this would be the year that Huddersfield Town would make the step up to the Championship. Peter Jackson showed his confidence by extending his contract until May 2009.  Notwithstanding the arrival of Luke Beckett departures, including Junior Mendes, exceeded arrivals.

The team made a sound start, with an encouraging home draw with much fancied Nottingham Forest, and they peaked at 5th on 21 October 2006. Some of the results in that period flattered the performances and the wheels came off in the next game with a 3–0 loss to Brighton & Hove Albion.

Despite an offer of cash from the Board, Peter Jackson declined to take any players on loan and the team spiralled downwards. Elimination, at home, in the first round of all three cup competitions did nothing to lift the gloom and on 5 January, in the televised encounter at Yeovil Town, the team played perhaps the worst 45 minutes of football in recent seasons to go 3–0 down at half-time (the game finished 3–1).

Around the January transfer window, Paweł Abbott and Danny Adams left, with Jackson indicating that Martin McIntosh and Mark Hudson would not play for the Club again, while Andy Taylor joined from Blackburn Rovers on loan until 5 April 2007, and Frank Sinclair joined from Burnley for the rest of the season. Also signed on a loan deal, on 23 February, was Barnsley striker Paul Hayes who played four games before his return.

A 5–1 thrashing at Nottingham Forest, on 3 March, lead directly to the departure of Peter Jackson on 6 March 2007, according to a Board statement, "due to our form and the inability to attract key players".

Academy Director Gerry Murphy was appointed caretaker manager, one of whose first acts was to bring Martin McIntosh and Mark Hudson back into the reckoning, and Huddersfield went unbeaten in the first five games with Murphy in charge until they lost 2–0 at home to Blackpool on 9 April 2007, his last game as manager.

On 4 April 2007, a press conference was scheduled to announce the appointment of Charlton Athletic's assistant manager Phil Parkinson as the new manager. However he telephoned the Club, just over an hour before the press conference was due to begin, to reveal that he was staying with Charlton Athletic. Andy Ritchie was then appointed Huddersfield Town manager on 11 April 2007 on a two-year contract.

On 17 April, it was announced that Huddersfield Town's sponsors, Yorkshire Building Society and kit suppliers Admiral would be replaced. The new kit supplier was Huddersfield based Mitre and the new sponsors were Gibraltar based gambling outfit CasinoRed.com, who were given a contract for 12 months with an option to extend for a further two years.

Also on 17 April, Gerry Murphy, was promoted to a new position as Director of Football Development where he would be in overall control of scouting as well as his existing duties as Academy Director.

On 5 May, it was announced that six of Town's second-year scholars were offered professional contracts. They were Joe Skarz (who had already signed his), Luke Malcher, Simon Eastwood, James Berrett, Mitchell Bailey, and Lucas Akins,   who had already been offered a new professional contract. Fellow youngster Alex Hallam was released.

Ritchie was in charge for the final four matches of the season with the team collecting seven points out of 12. The team finished the season in 15th position with 59 points, 16 points below the play-off places but 12 points above the relegation positions.

Events
Peter Jackson signed a two-year extension to his contract, on 18 May 2006, that will see him managing Town until May 2009. Then on 27 June 2006 he made his first summer signing by snapping up 27-year-old goalkeeper Matt Glennon from St Johnstone on a free. On 29 June 2006, Junior Mendes moved to Notts County while Phil Senior went to Northwich Victoria on 30 June, both also without a fee.

3 July 2006 saw Huddersfield sign 29-year-old Sheffield United striker Luke Beckett, for £85,000, on a three-year deal. Beckett scored six goals in seven games for Huddersfield during a loan spell in 2005. 

On 8 August 2006, Gary Taylor-Fletcher scored the 500,000th goal in English league football, with a fierce 25-yard drive that nestled into the top-left corner, to lead the Terriers to a 3–0 home victory over Rotherham United.

Peter Jackson was sent to the stands, on 12 August 2006, after grabbing Bristol City's Lee Johnson around the throat in a touchline altercation 10 minutes from time in Huddersfield's 2–1 win over Bristol City. On 30 August 2006 The F.A. charged Jackson with improper conduct over the incident and he was fined £300.

From 18 August 2006, Martin McIntosh went on a month's loan to Grimsby Town but regained his place immediately on his return.   On the same date, Gary Taylor-Fletcher signed a two-year contract extension which keeps him at the club until the end of the 2008–09 season, following closely on David Mirfin signing an identical contract extension.

John McAliskey was loaned to Wrexham for a month on 19 September 2006.

On 21 December, Terry Yorath quit his role as assistant manager, partially down to his three-month illness of pancreatitis. He was replaced by first team coach John Dungworth, who had been covering him in his absence.

Paul Rachubka was taken on loan to Peterborough United as cover for Mark Tyler and played four League 2 matches over Christmas/New Year 2006–07.

Peter Jackson was again sent to the stands in the Terriers' 3–2 victory over Swansea City, on 30 December 2006, for aggressively protesting a throw-in decision that lead to Swansea's second goal but the F.A. decided to take no action.

In January 2007 Danny Adams and Martin McIntosh were informed that their contracts would not be renewed in the summer and were transfer listed along with Paweł Abbott. Also in January, Adnan Ahmed went to Lincoln City on a one-week trial.

On 13 January 2007, Peter Jackson announced that Joe Skarz would be the first choice left-back in preference to Danny Adams, who left the club on 23 January 2007 when his contract was cancelled 'by mutual consent'.

On 22 January 2007, Pawel Abbott signed for Swansea on a two and a half year deal for a transfer fee reported to be in the region of £150,000.   

Then, on 25 January it was announced that midfielder, Mark Hudson, would be transfer listed.

On 31 January 2007, as the transfer window started to close, Blackburn Rovers defender Andy Taylor was signed on loan by manager Peter Jackson. On the same date Paul Rachubka went on loan to Blackpool until the end of the season.

In early February, Frank Sinclair joined from Burnley for the rest of the season with a view to a longer deal.

On 6 March 2007, it was announced by Huddersfield Town that Peter Jackson had left the club with his contract cancelled by mutual consent.  Jackson's last game in charge was a dismal 5–1 defeat to Nottingham Forest on 3 March 2007.  A statement from the board said: "The Board's clearly stated minimum aim at the start of the season was to achieve a Play-Off position, but unfortunately due to our form and the inability to attract key players, this objective is now looking remote." Academy Director Gerry Murphy was appointed caretaker manager, while a lengthy selection process was put in train, and one of his first acts was to bring Martin McIntosh and Mark Hudson back into the reckoning.

On 15 March, John McCombe joined Boston United on loan, but was recalled on 23 March, without making a single appearance for Boston. Then on 21 March, Chris Brandon joined Paul Rachubka on loan at Blackpool. The following day, Paul Hayes returned to Barnsley.

On 31 March, Hudson and McIntosh were both in the starting line up for the match against Port Vale which ended 2-2. John McAliskey scored his first goal of the season and his first for nearly 2½ years. Andy Taylor was recalled by Blackburn Rovers on 5 April 2007.

The selection process for the new manager was accident prone. Kevin Blackwell pulled out to take the Luton Town manager's position on 27 March 2007, the day that he was due to be interviewed, then on 4 April 2007 a press conference was scheduled to announce the appointment of Phil Parkinson as the new manager. However he telephoned the Club, just over an hour before the press conference was due to begin, to reveal that he was staying with Charlton Athletic. It was widely reported on Bank Holiday Monday that Andy Ritchie was to be appointed Huddersfield Town manager, but it was not officially announced until 11 April 2007, and he  will be on a two-year contract.

Squad at the end of the season

Final league table

Results

Pre-season matches

Football League One

FA Cup

League Cup

Football League Trophy

Appearances and goals

References

2006-07
2006–07 Football League One by team